John Livingston, or John Livingstone, may refer to:

 John Livingstone (minister) (1603-1672), Scottish Presbyterian minister exiled to Holland
 John Henry Livingston (1746–1825), American academic
 John Henry Livingston (1848–1927), American lawyer
 John Livingston (1857–1935), Australian politician
 John H. Livingston (1897–1974), American aviator and air race pilot
 Jonathan Livingston Seagull, 1970 novel by Richard Bach, for which Livingston is considered to be the inspiration and namesake
 Jonathan Livingston Seagull (film), 1973 film adapted from the novel
 Jonathan Livingston Seagull (soundtrack), soundtrack album to the 1973 film, recorded by singer-songwriter Neil Diamond
 John Livingston (naturalist) (1923–2006), Canadian naturalist, broadcaster, author, and teacher
 John Livingstone (priest) (19282016), British priest
 John Cleve Livingston (born 1947), American rower
 John Livingstone (born c. 1954), Canadian politician
 John Livingston (actor) (born 1970), American actor starring in The Sterling Chase

See also 

 Livingston (surname)
 Livingstone (name)